E3 ubiquitin-protein ligase RNF125 is an enzyme that in humans is encoded by the RNF125 gene.

This gene encodes a novel E3 ubiquitin ligase that contains an N-terminal RING finger domain. The encoded protein may function as a positive regulator in the T-cell receptor signaling pathway.

References

Further reading

RING finger proteins